Emmanuel Boateng (born 17 June 1997) is a Ghanaian professional footballer who plays as a midfielder for IF Elfsborg in the Swedish Allsvenskan.

Career

WAFA
Boateng grew up at the West African Football Academy (WAFA) from Ghana where he played until January 2018. He was one of the prominent players in the academy.

Aduana Stars 
He signed with Aduana Stars during January 2018. Won the Ghana Super Cup with the team and recorded 14 appearances in the 2018 Ghanaian Premier League, and in the CAF Champions League.

Hapoel Tel Aviv
In September 2018, he started to train with the Israeli Premier League club Hapoel Tel Aviv and eventually signed for five years at the club after being scouted and recommended by US based Italian agent/scout Simone Ghirlanda of Pan American Calcio.
In December 2018, he made his debut in the red uniform against the Bnei Sakhnin. He played 18 league games during the 2018–19 season, scored one important goal in the Tel Aviv derby and assisted three more goals.

Elfsborg
Emmanuel arrived in Borås 11 September 2021 and will be playing for the Swedish club located in the south west of Sweden, IF Elfsborg. IF Elfsborg is a club that missed Europa Conference League 2021 after a 3 goal-loss against the Dutch side Feyenoord in the play-off.

Career statistics

Honours 
Aduana Stars
 Ghana Super Cup: 2018

References

External links
 

1997 births
Living people
People from Eastern Region (Ghana)
Association football forwards
Ghanaian footballers
Hapoel Tel Aviv F.C. players
IF Elfsborg players
Ghana Premier League players
Israeli Premier League players
Allsvenskan players
Ghanaian expatriate footballers
Ghanaian expatriate sportspeople in Israel
Expatriate footballers in Israel
Ghanaian expatriate sportspeople in Sweden
Expatriate footballers in Sweden